Tony Pritchard is an English actor.

Career
He appeared in the 2000 film Quills as Valcour. He also starred in the British short film A Girl and a Gun (2007), as well as making appearances on EastEnders as Isaacs, The Bill as David Ellis, and he also played a minor role in Coronation Street as a businessman whom Liz McDonald met in a bar. In October 2019, he made an appearance in an episode of the BBC soap opera Doctors as Clive Heath.

References

External links 
 

Living people
Year of birth missing (living people)